Danger Danger is the debut studio album by the glam metal band Danger Danger. It was released in 1989 on Epic Records.

Track listing
 "Naughty Naughty" - 4:50
 "Under the Gun" - 4:39
 "Saturday Nite" - 4:17
 "Don't Walk Away" - 4:56
 "Bang Bang" - 3:56
 "Rock America" - 4:54
 "Boys Will Be Boys" - 4:58
 "One Step From Paradise" - 4:47
 "Feels Like Love" - 4:52
 "Turn It On" - 3:40
 "Live It Up" - 3:54

All songs written by Bruno Ravel and Steve West.

Credits

Musicians
Danger Danger
 Ted Poley - lead and backing vocals
 Kasey Smith - keyboards
 Bruno Ravel - bass guitar, backing vocals, cello, rap (11)
 Steve West - drums, rap (1)
 Andy Timmons - guitar (3, 7)

Additional musicians
 Tony "Bruno" Rey - guitar (1, 2, 4-6, 8-11)
 Rick Valente - backing vocals, harmonica (11)
 Carol Brooks, Jeanie Brooks, Rick Valente, Tony Rey  - backing vocals 
 Monica - spoken word (1, 11)

Other
Mark Ryden - cover art

References

1989 debut albums
Danger Danger albums
Epic Records albums
Albums with cover art by Mark Ryden